Iwasaki Nojo Tameike Dam  is an earthfill dam located in Iwate Prefecture in Japan. The dam is used for irrigation. The dam impounds about 14  ha of land when full and can store 820 thousand cubic meters of water. The construction of the dam was completed in 1938.

See also
List of dams in Japan

References

Dams in Iwate Prefecture